Donald Constable (born March 1, 1989) is an American former professional golfer who has regained his amateur status.

Previous amateur career
Constable played two years for the Texas Longhorns and two years for the Minnesota Golden Gophers.

He won the 2010 North and South Amateur. He was also the Minnesota high school and Minnesota Amateur champion.

Professional career
Constable qualified for the 2013 PGA Tour, making his way though all rounds of qualifying school. On the PGA Tour, he failed in make the cut in all 16 events he played in 2013. He later played on the Web.com Tour and PGA Tour Canada.

In 2014, he won the Waterloo Open Golf Classic.

Return to amateur status
After a seven year professional career, Constable regained his amateur status in May 2021.

Amateur wins
2005 Minnesota State Junior Boys' Championship
2009 Minnesota Amateur Match Play Championship
2010 North and South Amateur
2011 Minnesota Amateur
2012 Terra Cotta Invitational

Professional wins
2013 Coors Light Open
2014 Waterloo Open Golf Classic

Results in major championships

CUT = missed the half-way cut

See also
2012 PGA Tour Qualifying School graduates

References

External links

American male golfers
PGA Tour golfers
Texas Longhorns men's golfers
Minnesota Golden Gophers men's golfers
Golfers from Minnesota
People from Minnetonka, Minnesota
1989 births
Living people